Acantholycosa lignaria is a species of wolf spiders. It is a widespread species of central and northern Europe.

It was described in chapter 5 of the book Svenska Spindlar by the Swedish arachnologist and entomologist Carl Alexander Clerck.

References 

 Acantholycosa lignaria at Fauna Europaea

Spiders described in 1757
Taxa named by Carl Alexander Clerck
Spiders of Europe
Lycosidae